The International Date Line (IDL) is an internationally accepted demarcation of the surface of Earth, running between the South and North Poles and serving as the boundary between one calendar day and the next. It passes through the Pacific Ocean, roughly following the 180° line of longitude and deviating to pass around some territories and island groups. Crossing the date line eastbound decreases the date by one day, while crossing the date line westbound increases the date.

Geography

Circumnavigating the globe

People traveling westward around the world must set their clocks: 
Back by one hour for every 15° of longitude crossed, and 
Forward by 24 hours upon crossing the International Date Line.

People traveling eastward must set their clocks: 
Forward by one hour for every 15° of longitude crossed, and 
Back by 24 hours upon crossing the International Date Line.

Failing to do this would make their time inaccurate to the local time.

The Arab geographer Abulfeda (1273–1331) predicted that circumnavigators would accumulate a one-day offset to the local date. This phenomenon was confirmed in 1522 at the end of the Magellan–Elcano circumnavigation (1519–1522), the first successful circumnavigation. After sailing westward around the world from Spain, the expedition called at Cape Verde for provisions on Wednesday, 9 July 1522 (ship's time). However, the locals told them that it was actually Thursday, 10 July 1522. The crew was surprised, as they had recorded each day of the three-year journey without omission. Cardinal Gasparo Contarini, the Venetian ambassador to Spain, was the first European to give a correct explanation of the discrepancy.

Description

This description is based on the most common understanding of the de facto International Date Line.
The IDL is roughly based on the meridian of 180° longitude, roughly down the middle of the Pacific Ocean, and halfway around the world from the IERS Reference Meridian, the successor to the historic Greenwich Prime Meridian running through the Royal Greenwich Observatory. In many places, the IDL follows the 180° meridian exactly. In other places, however, the IDL deviates east or west away from that meridian. These various deviations generally accommodate the political and/or economic affiliations of the affected areas.

Proceeding from north to south, the first deviation of the IDL from 180° is to pass to the east of Wrangel Island and the Chukchi Peninsula, the easternmost part of Russian Siberia. (Wrangel Island lies directly on the meridian at 71°32′N 180°0′E, also noted as 71°32′N 180°0′W.)

The IDL crosses between the U.S. Aleutian Islands (Attu Island being the westernmost) and the Commander Islands, which belong to Russia. It then bends southeast again to return to 180°. Thus, all of Russia is to the west of the IDL, and all of the United States is to the east except for the insular areas of Guam, the Northern Mariana Islands, and Wake Island.

The IDL remains on the 180° meridian until passing the equator. Two US-owned uninhabited atolls, Howland Island and Baker Island, just north of the equator in the central Pacific Ocean (and ships at sea between 172.5°W and 180°), have the earliest time on Earth (UTC−12:00 hours).

The IDL circumscribes Kiribati by swinging far to the east, almost reaching the 150°W meridian. Kiribati's easternmost islands, the southern Line Islands south of Hawaii, have the latest time on Earth, UTC+14:00 hours.

South of Kiribati, the IDL returns westwards but remains east of 180°, passing between Samoa and American Samoa. Accordingly, Samoa, Tokelau, Wallis and Futuna, Fiji, Tonga, Tuvalu, and New Zealand's Kermadec Islands and Chatham Islands are all west of the IDL and have the same date. American Samoa, the Cook Islands, Niue, and French Polynesia are east of the IDL and one day behind.

The IDL then bends southwest to return to 180°. It follows that meridian until reaching Antarctica, which has multiple time zones. Conventionally, the IDL is not drawn into Antarctica on most maps.

Facts dependent on the IDL

For the two hours between 10:00 and 11:59 UTC each day, three different calendar dates are observed at the same time in different places on Earth. For example, at 10:15 UTC Thursday, it is 23:15 Wednesday in American Samoa (UTC−11:00), Thursday in most of the world, and 00:15 Friday in Kiritimati (UTC+14:00).

During the first hour (UTC 10:00–10:59), all three calendar dates include inhabited places.  During the second hour (UTC 11:00–11:59) one of the calendar dates is limited to an uninhabited maritime time zone twelve hours behind UTC (UTC−12:00).

According to the clock, the first areas to experience a new day and a New Year are islands that use UTC+14:00. These include portions of the Republic of Kiribati, including Millennium Island in the Line Islands. The first major cities to experience a new day are Auckland and Wellington, New Zealand (UTC+12:00; UTC+13:00 with daylight saving time).

A 1994 realignment of the IDL made Caroline Island one of the first points of land on Earth to reach January 1, 2000, on the calendar (UTC+14:00). As a result, this atoll was renamed Millennium Island.

The areas that are the first to see the daylight of a new day vary by the season. Around the June solstice, the first area would be any place within the Kamchatka Time Zone (UTC+12:00) that is far enough north to experience midnight sun on the given date. At the equinoxes, the first place to see daylight would be the uninhabited Millennium Island in Kiribati, which is the easternmost land located west of the IDL.

Near the December solstice, the first places would be Antarctic research stations using New Zealand Time (UTC+13:00) during summer that experience midnight sun. These include Amundsen-Scott South Pole Station, McMurdo Station, Scott Base and Zucchelli Station.

De facto and de jure date lines 

There are two ways time zones and thereby the location of the International Date Line are determined, one on land and adjacent territorial waters, and the other on open seas.

All nations unilaterally determine their standard time zones, applicable only on land and adjacent territorial waters. This date line can be called de facto since it is not based on international law, but on national laws. These national zones do not extend into international waters.

The nautical date line, not the same as the IDL, is a de jure construction determined by international agreement. It is the result of the 1917 Anglo-French Conference on Time-keeping at Sea, which recommended that all ships, both military and civilian, adopt hourly standard time zones on the high seas. The United States adopted its recommendation for U.S. military and merchant marine ships in 1920. This date line is implied but not explicitly drawn on time zone maps. It follows the 180° meridian except where it is interrupted by territorial waters adjacent to land, forming gaps—it is a pole-to-pole dashed line. The 15° gore that is offset from UTC by 12 hours is bisected by the nautical date line into two 7.5° gores that differ from UTC by ±12 hours.

In theory, ships are supposed to adopt the standard time of a country if they are within its territorial waters within  of land, then revert to international time zones (15° wide pole-to-pole gores) as soon as they leave. In practice, ships use these time zones only for radio communication and similar purposes. For internal (within-ship) purposes, such as work and meal hours, ships use a time zone of their own choosing.

Cartographic practice and convention
The IDL on the map in this article and all other maps is based on the de facto line and is an artificial construct of cartographers, as the precise course of the line in international waters is arbitrary. The IDL does not extend into Antarctica on the world time zone maps by the United States Central Intelligence Agency (CIA) or the United Kingdom's His Majesty's Nautical Almanac Office (HMNAO). The current HMNAO map does not draw the IDL in conformity with recent shifts in the IDL; it draws a line virtually identical to that adopted by the UK's Hydrographic Office about 1900. Instead, HMNAO labels island groups with their time zones, which do reflect the most recent IDL shifts. This approach is consistent with the principle of national and nautical time zones: the islands of eastern Kiribati are actually "islands" of Asian date (west side of IDL) in a sea of American date (east side of IDL). Similarly, the western Aleutian Islands are islands of American date in a sea of Asian date.

No international organization, nor any treaty between nations, has fixed the IDL drawn by cartographers: the 1884 International Meridian Conference explicitly refused to propose or agree to any time zones, stating that they were outside its purview. The conference resolved that the Universal Day, midnight-to-midnight Greenwich Mean Time (now redefined and updated as Coordinated Universal Time, or UTC), which it did agree to, "shall not interfere with the use of local or standard time where desirable".  From this comes the utility and importance of UTC or "Z" ("Zulu") time: it permits a single universal reference for time that is valid for all points on the globe at the same moment.

Historic alterations

Philippines (1521 and 1844)

Ferdinand Magellan claimed the Philippines for Spain on Saturday, having sailed westwards from Seville across the Atlantic Ocean and the Pacific Ocean. As part of New Spain, the Philippines had its most important communication with Acapulco in Mexico, so it was on the eastern side of the IDL despite being on the western edge of the Pacific Ocean. As a result, the Philippines was one day behind its Asian neighbours for 323 years, 9 months and 2 weeks from Saturday, 16 March 1521 (Julian Calendar) to Monday, 30 December 1844 (Gregorian Calendar).

After Mexico gained its independence from Spain on 27 September 1821, Philippine trade interests turned to Imperial China, the Dutch East Indies and adjacent areas, so the Philippines decided to join its Asian neighbours on the west side of the IDL. To advance the calendar by one day on order of the then governor-general Narciso Claveria, Tuesday,  was removed from the calendar. Monday,  was followed immediately by Wednesday, . The change also applied to the other remaining Spanish colonies in the Pacific: the Caroline Island, Guam, Mariana Islands, Marshall Islands and Palau as part of the Captaincy General of the Philippines. Western publications were generally unaware of this change until the early 1890s, so they erroneously gave the International Date Line a large western bulge for the next half century.

Tahiti & French Polynesia (early 1797 and late 1846)
On 5 March 1797, missionaries of the London Missionary Society arrived on Tahiti from England. They had first tried to pass Cape Horn, but failing that, went along Cape of Good Hope and the Indian Ocean instead. As such, they introduced the date of the eastern hemisphere on the island. It was not until the ending of the Franco-Tahitian War and the restoration of the French Protectorate over the Tahitian Kingdom (which Tahitian nationalists had tried to fight off for two years of intense war with more than 1000 deaths) that the French commissioner Armand Joseph Bruat  and the regent of the Tahitian Kingdom Paraita ordered that Tahiti had to follow the western hemisphere on 29 December 1846.

Alaska (1867)

Alaska was on the western side of the International Date Line, since Russian settlers reached Alaska from Siberia. In addition, the Russian Empire was still using the Julian calendar, which had fallen 12 days behind the Gregorian calendar. In 1867, the United States purchased Russian America and moved the territory to the east side of the International Date Line. The transfer ceremony took place at 3:30p.m. local mean time (00:31 GMT) in the capital of New Archangel (Sitka), on Saturday,  (Julian), which was Saturday,  (Gregorian) in Europe. Since Alaska moved to the eastern side of the International Date Line, the date and time also moved back to 3:30p.m. local time Friday,  (00:31 GMT Saturday), now known as Alaska Day.

Samoan Islands and Tokelau (1892 and 2011)
The Samoan Islands, now divided into Samoa and American Samoa, were on the west side of the IDL until 1892.  In that year, King Mālietoa Laupepa was persuaded by American traders to adopt the American date (three hours behind California) to replace the former Asian date (four hours ahead of Japan). The change was made by repeating , American Independence Day.

In 2011, Samoa shifted back to the west side of the IDL by removing Friday,  from its calendar. This changed the time zone from UTC−11:00 to UTC+13:00 (UTC-10 to UTC+14 Dst ).  Samoa made the change because Australia and New Zealand have become its biggest trading partners, and also have large communities of expatriates. Being 21 hours behind made business difficult because having weekends on backward days meant only four days of the week were shared workdays.

The IDL now passes between Samoa and American Samoa, which remains on the east (American) side of the line.

Tokelau is a territory of New Zealand north of Samoa whose principal transportation and communications links with the rest of the world pass through Samoa. For that reason, Tokelau crossed the IDL along with Samoa in 2011, albeit strictly speaking 1 hour later, as they did not do Summer Time (Daylight Saving Time in American English), which Samoa did then.

Kwajalein (c. 1945 and 1993)
Kwajalein atoll, like the rest of the Marshall Islands, passed from Spanish to German to Japanese control during the nineteenth and twentieth centuries. During that period it was west of the IDL. Although Kwajalein formally became part of the Trust Territory of the Pacific Islands with the rest of the Marshalls after World War II, the United States established a military installation there. Because of that, Kwajalein used the Hawaiian date, so was effectively east of the International Date Line (unlike the rest of the Marshalls). Kwajalein returned to the west side of the IDL by removing Saturday,  from its calendar. Moreover, Kwajalein's work week was changed to Tuesday through Saturday to match the Hawaiian work week of Monday through Friday on the other side of the IDL.

Eastern Kiribati (1994)
As a British colony, the now-Republic of Kiribati was centered in the Gilbert Islands, just west of the IDL of the time. Upon independence in 1979, it acquired the claim to the Phoenix and Line Islands, east of the IDL, from the United States. As a result, the country straddled the IDL. Government and commercial concerns on opposite sides of the line could only conduct routine business by radio or telephone on the four days of the week which were weekdays on both sides. To eliminate this anomaly, Kiribati introduced a change of date for its eastern half by removing Saturday,  from its calendar. Because of this, Friday, 30 December 1994, was followed by Sunday, 1 January 1995. After the change, the IDL in effect moved eastwards to go around the entire country. Strictly legal, the 1917 nautical IDL convention is still valid. When the land time zone says it's Monday, these islands would form enclaves of Monday in an ocean which has Sunday. Maps are usually not drawn this way.

As a consequence of the 1994 change, Kiribati's easternmost territory, the Line Islands, including the inhabited island of Kiritimati (Christmas Island), started the year 2000 before any other country, a feature upon which the Kiribati government capitalized as a potential tourist draw.

Date lines according to religious principles

Christianity

Generally, the Christian calendar  and Christian churches recognize the IDL.  Christmas for example, is celebrated on 25 December (according to either the Gregorian or the Julian calendar, depending upon which of the two is used by the particular church) as that date falls in countries located on either side of the Date Line.  Thus, whether it is Western Christmas or Orthodox Christmas, Christians in Samoa, immediately west of the Date Line, will celebrate the holiday a day before Christians in American Samoa, which is immediately east of the Date Line.

A problem with the general rule above arises in certain Christian churches that solemnly observe a Sabbath day as a particular day of the week, when those churches are located in countries near the Date Line. Notwithstanding the difference in dates, the same sunrise happened over American Samoa as happens over Samoa a few minutes later, and the same sunset happens over Samoa as happened over American Samoa a few minutes earlier.  In other words, the secular days are legally different but they are physically the same; and that causes questions to arise under religious law.

Because the Date Line was an arbitrary imposition, the question can arise as to which Saturday on either side of the Date Line (or, more fundamentally, on either side of 180 degrees longitude) is the "real" Saturday.  This issue (which also arises in Judaism) is a particular problem for Seventh Day Adventists, Seventh Day Baptists, and similar churches located in countries near the Date Line.

In Tonga, Seventh Day Adventists (who usually observe Saturday, the seventh-day Sabbath) observe Sunday due to their understanding of the International Date Line, as Tonga lies east of the 180° meridian. Sunday as observed in Tonga (West of the Date Line, as with Kiribati, Samoa, and parts of Fiji and Tuvalu) is considered by the Seventh-day Adventist Church to be the same day as Saturday observed East of the Date line.

Most Seventh Day Adventists in Samoa planned to observe Sabbath on Sunday after Samoa's crossing the date line in December 2011, but SDA groups in Samatau village and other places (approx. 300 members) decided to accept the IDL adjustment and observe the Sabbath on Saturday. Debate continues within the Seventh-day Adventist community in the Pacific as to which day is really the seventh-day Sabbath.

The Samoan Independent Seventh-day Adventist Church, which is not affiliated to the worldwide Seventh-day Adventist Church, has decided to continue worshiping on Saturday, after a six-day week at the end of 2011.

Islam
Similarly, the Islamic calendar and Muslim communities recognize the convention of the IDL. In particular, the day for holding the Jumu'ah prayer appears to be local Friday everywhere in the world.

The IDL is not a factor in the start and end of Islamic lunar months. These depend solely on sighting the new crescent moon. As an example, the fasts of the month of Ramadan begin the morning after the crescent is sighted. That this day may vary in different parts of the world is well known in Islam. (See .)

Judaism

The concept of an international date line in Jewish law is first mentioned by 12th-century decisors. But it was not until the introduction of improved transportation and communications systems in the 20th century that the question of an international date line truly became a question of practical Jewish law.

As a practical matter, the conventional International Date Line—or another line in the Pacific Ocean close to it—serves as a de facto date line for purposes of Jewish law, at least in existing Jewish communities. For example, residents of the Jewish communities of Japan, New Zealand, Hawaii, and French Polynesia all observe Shabbat on local Saturday. However, there is not unanimity as to how Jewish law reaches that conclusion. For this reason, some authorities rule that certain aspects of Sabbath observance are required on Sunday (in Japan and New Zealand) or Friday (in Hawaii and French Polynesia) in addition to Saturday. Additionally, there are differences of opinion as to which day or days individual Jews traveling in the Pacific region away from established Jewish communities should observe Shabbat.

For individuals crossing the date line, the change of calendar date influences some aspects of practice under Jewish law. Yet other aspects depend on an individual's experience of sunsets and sunrises to count days, notwithstanding the calendar date.

Cultural references and traditions

The Island of the Day Before
The date line is a central factor in Umberto Eco's book The Island of the Day Before (1994), in which the protagonist finds himself on a becalmed ship, with an island close at hand on the other side of the IDL. Unable to swim, the protagonist indulges in increasingly imaginative speculation regarding the physical, metaphysical and religious importance of the date line.

Around the World in Eighty Days
The concept behind the IDL (though not the IDL itself, which did not yet exist) appears as a plot device in Jules Verne's book Around the World in Eighty Days (1873). The main protagonist, Phileas Fogg, travels eastward around the world. He had bet with his friends that he could do it in 80 days. To win the wager, Fogg must return by 8:45 p.m. on Saturday, 21 December 1872. However, the journey suffers a series of delays and when Fogg reaches London, it is 8:50 p.m. on Friday, 20 December, although he believes it is Saturday, 21 December and that he has lost the wager by a margin of only five minutes. The next day, however, it is revealed that the day is Saturday, not Sunday, and Fogg arrives at his club just in time to win the bet. Verne explains:
In journeying eastward he  had gone towards the sun, and the days therefore diminished for him as many times four minutes as he crossed degrees in this direction. There are three hundred and sixty degrees on the circumference of the earth; and these three hundred and sixty degrees, multiplied by four minutes, gives precisely twenty-four hours — that is, the day unconsciously gained. In other words, while Phileas Fogg, going eastward, saw the sun pass the meridian eighty times, his friends in London only saw it pass the meridian seventy-nine times.

Fogg had thought it was one day later than it actually was, because he had forgotten this simple fact. During his journey, he had added a full day to his clock, at the rhythm of an hour per fifteen degrees, or four minutes per degree, as Verne writes. At the time, the concept of a de jure International Date Line did not exist. If it did, he would have been made aware that it would be a day less than it used to be once he reached this line. Thus, the day he would add to his clock throughout his journey would be thoroughly removed upon crossing this imaginary line. But a de facto date line did exist since the U.K., India, and the U.S. had the same calendar with different local times, and he should have noticed when he arrived in the U.S. that the local date was not the same as in his diary (his servant Jean Passepartout kept his watch set to London time, despite the clues from his surroundings).

Line-crossing ceremonies relating to the IDL

Ceremonies aboard ships to mark a sailor's or passenger's first crossing of the Equator, as well as crossing the International Date Line, have been long-held traditions in navies and in other maritime services around the world.

Notes

References 

Bering Sea
Chukchi Sea
Kiribati
Samoa
Pacific Ocean
Time